Hasta may refer to:

Latin
Hasta (spear)
Hasta Pompeia, a Roman town today known as Asti

Sanskrit
Hasta (hand), a Sanskrit word meaning hand gesture or position
Hasta (unit), a measure of length
Hasta (nakshatra), the thirteenth nakshatra of Hindu astrology

Fictional character
Hasta Ekstermi

HASTA
Heart of America Suzuki Teachers Association, a Kansas City area chapter affiliate of the Suzuki Association of the Americas

See also
Asta (disambiguation)
Hatra
Hosta